Malnutrition in Nigeria, directly or indirectly, is the cause of 45 percent of all death of under-five children. Malnutrition is the cause of stunted growth in over 28 million  children in sub-Saharan Africa.
Malnutrition is referred to as deficiencies or excesses in nutrient intake, imbalance of essential nutrients, or impaired nutrient utilization. Nigeria, with the biggest economy in Africa is yet to make a breakthrough in the malnutrition problem facing millions of its citizens, especially children. In Nigeria, the situation of malnutrition is very appalling. In the world, Nigeria is the second highest with the burden of stunted children with a national prevalence rate of 32 percent of children under five. Also an estimate of 2 million children are suffering from severe acute malnutrition (SAM) in Nigeria. The main reason why malnutrition is high in Nigeria is its close association with poverty, with 47 percent of Nigerians (98 million) living in multidimensional poverty.

References 

Food and drink in Nigeria
Malnutrition